Lingcheng District, formerly Ling County or Lingxian, is a district of the city of Dezhou, Shandong province, China. On 29 October 2014, the State Council approved the conversion of the former Ling County to Lingcheng District.

Administrative divisions
As 2012, this District is divided to 2 subdistricts, 10 towns and 1 townships.
Subdistricts
Ande Subdistrict
Linji Subdistrict

Towns

Townships
Yuji Township

Climate

References

External links

County-level divisions of Shandong